The Best of Pino Daniele: Yes I Know My Way is a compilation album by Italian musician Pino Daniele, released in 1998.

Track listing 

All tracks written by Pino Daniele, except where noted.

Charts

Weekly charts

References

External links 

 

1998 compilation albums
Pino Daniele compilation albums
Compagnia Generale del Disco compilation albums